Charmian Carr (born Charmian Anne Farnon; December 27, 1942 – September 17, 2016) was an American actress best known for her role as Liesl, the eldest von Trapp daughter in the 1965 film version of The Sound of Music.

Early life
Carr was born Charmian Anne Farnon in Chicago, Illinois, the second child of vaudeville actress Rita Oehmen and musician Brian Farnon. The couple divorced in 1957. She had two sisters, both actresses (Shannon Farnon and Darleen Carr). Her family moved to Los Angeles when she was 10. While a student at San Fernando High School, graduating in 1960, Carr was a cheerleader and played basketball and volleyball. "She had never had a singing lesson and had never tried to act" before she was signed to be in The Sound of Music.

The Sound of Music
Carr was attending San Fernando Valley State College, studying speech therapy and philosophy, and working for a doctor, when her mother arranged for her to audition for a role in The Sound of Music. Rita Farnon had not asked Charmian if she wanted to audition for the part, but Charmian was sure her mother would consider getting a part in a film more important than earning a college degree.

In a newspaper article published November 9, 1964, Carr related the story behind the tryout as follows:

Director Robert Wise thought Farnon was too long a surname paired with Charmian. After he had given her a list of single syllable surnames, she chose Carr. She won the role of Liesl over Geraldine Chaplin, Kim Darby, Patty Duke, Shelley Fabares, Teri Garr, Mia Farrow and Lesley Ann Warren. The film was on the whole a very happy experience for her. However, during the filming of her dance scene with Rolf in the gazebo, the costumers had forgotten to put no-slip pads on her shoes. She slid through a window of the gazebo, and she "had to complete the scene in agony."

Later life
In 1965, Carr worked with Van Johnson on a pilot for a television program, Take Her, She's Mine. Carr then appeared in Evening Primrose, a one-hour musical written by Stephen Sondheim, which aired on ABC Stage 67 in 1966. The following year, she married a dentist, Jay Brent, and left show business; they divorced in 1991. She and Jay had two daughters, Jennifer and Emily. Later she became the grandmother of Emma and Derek.

Carr owned an interior design firm, Charmian Carr Designs, in Encino, California, and wrote two books, Forever Liesl and Letters to Liesl. She reunited with many of her co-stars from The Sound of Music on The Oprah Winfrey Show in October 2010 to celebrate the film's 45th anniversary. In 2014, Carr recorded "Edelweiss" with the great-grandchildren of the von Trapps on the album Dream a Little Dream by the von Trapps and Pink Martini.

Death

Carr died in Los Angeles on September 17, 2016, from complications related to frontotemporal dementia at the age of 73.

Filmography

References

External links

 
 

1942 births
2016 deaths
20th-century American actresses
American film actresses
American television actresses
American businesspeople
Actresses from Chicago
Deaths from dementia in California
Deaths from frontotemporal dementia
21st-century American women
California State University, Northridge alumni